The 1981 Jordanian  League (known as The Jordanian  League,   was the 31st season of Jordan League since its inception in 1944. Al-Ramtha won its first title.

Teams

Map

Overview
Al-Ramtha won his first title  championship.

League final standings

Promoted: Al-Qadisiya and Al-Baqa'a

Matches

Notes:
 Results in top right half apparently from first half season
 Results in bottom left half from second half season

Top scorers

References
RSSSF

External links
 Jordan Football Association website

Jordanian Pro League seasons
Jordan
Jordan
football